Bambolim is a neighborhood located in the southeastern part of the city of Panaji, the capital of the Indian state of Goa. It is completely located on the island of Tiswadi, one of the talukas in the state of Goa.

The only allopathic medical college in the state of Goa, Goa Medical College, is located here.

Geography
It has an average elevation of 1 metre (3 feet).

Demographics
 India census, Bambolim had a population of 5319. Males constitute 64% of the population and females 36%. Bambolim's literacy rate is 69% of the males and 31% of females. 10% of the population is under 6 years of age.

Bambolim Beach 
Bambolim beach is located about 7 km from Panaji.

References

Beaches of Goa
Neighbourhoods in Panaji
Beaches of North Goa district